Joanna Wronecka (born 30 March 1958 in Krotoszyn) is a Polish diplomat who has been serving as United Nations Special Coordinator for Lebanon since 2021. 

Wronecka served as Poland's ambassador to Egypt (1999–2003), Morocco (2005–2010), Permanent Representative to the United Nations (2017–2021), and as European Union Ambassador to Jordan (2011–2015).

Early life and education 
Wronecka graduated from Faculty of Arabic Studies of the University of Warsaw. She studied in Algeria, Egypt and France as well. In 1985 she defended her PhD thesis on Arab-Muslim philosophy. In 1980s she has been working at the Polish Academy of Sciences.

Diplomatic career 
In 1993 Wronecka joined the Polish diplomatic service, starting from the post of an expert. In 1996–1998 she was deputy director of the Department of the United Nations System and director of the Department of Africa and the Middle East (1998–1999) and Minister’s Secretariat (2003–2005). She served as Poland ambassador to Egypt (1999–2003), Morocco accredited to Mauritania and Senegal (2005–2010). From January 2011 to August 2015 she held the position of Head of the European Union Delegation to Jordan. On 26 November 2015 she was appointed Under Secretary of State in the Ministry of Foreign Affairs of Poland  under minister Witold Waszczykowski, responsible for development aid as well as cooperation with African and Middle-East countries.

In November 2017 Wronecka became Permanent Representative of Poland to the United Nations. She ended her term on 31 May 2021. 

In 2021, United Nations Secretary-General António Guterres appointed Wronecka as UN Envoy to Lebanon.

Recognition 
In 2010 Wronecka received the Knight's Cross of the Order of Polonia Restituta.

Translations 

 Abū Hāmid al-Ġazālï: Nisza świateł. Joanna Wronecka (tran.). Warszawa: Państwowe Wydawnictwo Naukowe, 1990, 2013, 82 pp. .
 Ibn Arabi: Księga o podróży nocnej do najbardziej szlachetnego miejsca. Joanna Wronecka (tran.). Warszawa: Państwowe Wydawnictwo Naukowe, 1990, 2010, 132 pp. .
 Ibn Arabi: Traktat o miłości. Joanna Wronecka (tran.). Warszawa: Państwowe Wydawnictwo Naukowe, 1995, 2010, 210 pp. .

References 

1958 births
Ambassadors of the European Union to Jordan
Ambassadors of Poland to Egypt
Ambassadors of Poland to Morocco
Knights of the Order of Polonia Restituta
Living people
People from Krotoszyn
Permanent Representatives of Poland to the United Nations
Academic staff of the Polish Academy of Sciences
Polish officials of the European Union
University of Warsaw alumni
Polish women ambassadors
Translators from Arabic
Translators to Polish